Wrestling at the 2018 Summer Youth Olympics was held from 12 to 14 October. The events took place at the Asia Pavilion in Buenos Aires, Argentina.

Qualification
Each National Olympic Committee (NOC) can enter a maximum of 6 competitors, 2 in Boys' Freestyle, 2 in Boys' Greco-Roman and 2 in Girls' Freestyle. As hosts, Argentina was given 3 quotas, one in each discipline should they participate in the Cadet Pan American Championships. A further 12, 8 male and 4 female athletes were decided by the Tripartite Commission. The remaining 95 athletes, 50 male and 45 female qualified over five continental qualification tournaments. For the boys’ events, each continent qualified 1 athlete while for the girls’ events the top 3 Europeans, top 2 Asians and Pan Americans and the top African and Oceanian athletes qualified.

To be eligible to participate at the Youth Olympics athletes must have been born between 1 January 2001 and 31 December 2003.

Qualification Timeline

Qualification Summary

Medal summary

Medal table

Boy's events

Freestyle

Greco-Roman

Girl's events

Freestyle

References

External links
Official Results Book – Wrestling

 
2018 Summer Youth Olympics events
2018 in sport wrestling
2018
International wrestling competitions hosted by Argentina